Super Win the Game is an action role-playing video game released on October 1, 2014 by American studio Minor Key Games. The game is a sequel to the studio's prior work, You Have to Win the Game, and is an homage to Zelda II: The Adventure of Link. While critically praised, the game received lackluster sales, leading its lead developer Kyle Pittman to call it a "total failure".

Gameplay and story 
Super Win the Game is strictly platform-based, with the player character having no offensive abilities against enemies, unlike The Adventure of Link. Like The Adventure of Link, the player has access to a map screen which contains villages with NPCs, dungeons with obstacles to overcome and abilities inside, and other secrets. In the game, the player character, known as "Wayfarer", is tasked with collecting pieces of the Hollow King's heart, which has been broken by an evil wizard. In order to get these pieces and confront the wizard the player must collect several upgrades and new abilities, which unlock new areas and sections of levels in a Metroidvania format. Throughout the game, the player character can speak with creatures known as Arcadians, who claim to be from the stars. After returning the king's heart, the world is saved from the Hollow King's rule and peace is restored. An Arcadian asks the player character if they are ready to leave. Accepting his offer restarts the game from its prologue, but with no progress erased.

Reception and sales 
Super Win the Game was received positively by critics. Tom Sykes of PC Gamer praised the game's CRT simulation visuals as well as its open-ended gameplay. Angelo D'Argenio of GameCrate considered it "a game about secrets", comparing it to The Legend of Zelda: Breath of the Wild.

Although met with positive reception, Super Win the Game sold only 850 units in its first month after release, which lead developer Kyle Pittman called "a complete and total failure". Following this, Pittman stated that he no longer wished to continue to make pixel-art platformers in the vein of Super Win the Game.

References

External links 
 

Action role-playing video games
Fantasy video games
Platform games
Retro-style video games
Side-scrolling video games
Windows games
MacOS games
Linux games
Metroidvania games
Indie video games
2014 video games
Video games developed in the United States